Connellsville Area Career and Technical Center is a comprehensive Vocational-Technical School, in the Connellsville Area School District. The school is located above the Connellsville Area Senior High School. CACTC serves grades 11-12 Full-Time with core curriculum classes held at the school. Sophomore students attend part-time, while attending the Connellsville Area Senior High School for the core curriculum. The school is run by the Connellsville Area School District. In 2015, enrollment was reported as 279 pupils in 9th through 12th grades. The school employed 25 teachers.

Campus history 
The school opened in 1972 as North Fayette Area Vocational-Technical School, Connellsville along with Frazier School District,  managed the school as students from both schools attended either morning or afternoon sessions until 2001, when Frazier severed ties from the school, citing a lengthy distance between NFAVTS and their school campus, however, the students were able to complete their studies at North Fayette until they graduated. Students still attended half day sessions until 2007, when it was created into a single secondary school of the Connellsville Area School District and named its current name. In 2008, a $15 Million Renovation and Addition of the structure took place, adding a Gymnasium, Cafeteria, and a few more program areas.

Programs 
CACTC offers programs to choose from including:

 Automotive Collision Technology Repair
 Automotive Mechanics Technology
 Carpentry
 Computer Networking
 Cosmetology
 Culinary Arts/Bakery
 Electrical Occupations
 Electronic Technology
 Health Occupations
 HVAC
 Marketing/Management
 Masonry
 Protective Services
 Welding/Metal Fabrication

Adult Education 
The CACTC offers daytime education to adults and evening programs. The school also offers free GED assistance.

Extracurricular activities 
CACTC has many clubs pertaining to the curriculum; students, however, have the opportunity to participate in athletics at Connellsville Area Senior High School.

References 

 Connellsville Area Career and Technology Center
 US Department of Ed Page
 CACTC to have open House - Connellsville Daily Courier (02.15.10)

Educational institutions established in 1972
Public high schools in Pennsylvania
Schools in Fayette County, Pennsylvania
1972 establishments in Pennsylvania